Abbondio Sangiorgio (16 July 1798 – 2 November 1879) was an Italian sculptor of the neoclassical period.

Biography
Born in Milan, Sangiorgio studied at the city's Accademia di Brera. During his early career he worked for the Fabbrica del Duomo di Milano; later he received numerous commissions for large public sculptures in places including Turin (a Castor and Pollux for the Palazzo Reale), Milan, Brescia and Casale Monferrato (an equestrian portrait of Charles Albert of Piedmont-Sardinia). He also produced a large number of portrait sculptures in which he was able to express a predeliction for realism over neoclassicism.

Among Sangiorgio's students was Pietro Magni.

References

External links
 

Artists from Milan
1798 births
1879 deaths
19th-century Italian sculptors
Italian male sculptors
Brera Academy alumni
19th-century Italian male artists